Fabián Andrés Castillo Sánchez (born 17 June 1992) is a Colombian professional footballer who plays as a winger for Primera División de Chile club Colo-Colo.

Club career

Deportivo Cali
Castillo started his career in the youth ranks of Colombian side Deportivo Cali. In 2010, he joined the first team and became an important player for the club. On 18 July 2010, he scored his first professional goal in a 1–1 draw against Deportes Tolima. In his first year with the club, he appeared in 18 league matches and scored 3 goals. He also was able to help the club capture the 2010 Copa Colombia.

FC Dallas
On 3 March 2011, it was reported by Colombian news site El País, and later confirmed by FC Dallas Academy Director Óscar Pareja, that a deal had been reached to bring Castillo to FC Dallas on a 3-year deal. The report stated the transfer fee was US$800,000  and that FC Dallas would own 50% of the player's rights, while Deportivo Cali would retain the other half. FC Dallas confirmed the signing of Castillo on 7 March 2011. Terms were undisclosed.

Castillo debuted for Dallas on 26 March 2011, in a 2–1 loss to the San Jose Earthquakes. Castillo was named to the MLS Team of Week 9 in the 2011 MLS season for his play against Philadelphia Union and Toronto FC. He scored his first goal for the club against the Los Angeles Galaxy on 1 May 2011.

On 10 February 2015, FC Dallas announced that Castillo was signed to a new five-year contract. Per league and team policy, the terms of the agreement were not to be disclosed. On Saturday, 18 July 2015, it was announced that Castillo would be part of the 2015 AT&T MLS All-Star team that would play against Tottenham Hotspur. On Wednesday, July 29, Castillo came on at halftime and played a full 45 minutes.

Trabzonspor
On August 4, 2016, Trabzonspor announced they had acquired Castillo on a six-month loan for an upfront payment of $3 million and an option to buy in January for an additional $1–1.5 million. Trabzonspor opted to make the deal permanent on January 7, 2017.

Tijuana
On July 26, 2018, Castillo signed for Liga MX side Club Tijuana.

International career
Castillo has participated in various youth national teams for Colombia, including the Under-17 and Under-20 national team. He made his senior international debut in a draw with Peru on September 8, 2015.

Style of play 
Castillo is mainly known for his quick feet and dribbling skills.

Personal life
Castillo earned his U.S. green card in July 2015. This status qualifies him as a domestic player for MLS roster purposes.

Career statistics

References

http://mlsmultiplex.com/2016/07/31/fabian-castillo-to-return-to-fc-dallas-after-transfer-talks-with-trabzonspor-break-down/

External links
 
 
 

1992 births
Living people
Colombian footballers
Colombian expatriate footballers
Colombia youth international footballers
Colombia under-20 international footballers
Colombia international footballers
Footballers from Cali
Colombian expatriate sportspeople in Turkey
Expatriate footballers in Turkey
Deportivo Cali footballers
FC Dallas players
Trabzonspor footballers
Club Tijuana footballers
Querétaro F.C. footballers
Colo-Colo footballers
Expatriate soccer players in the United States
Categoría Primera A players
Major League Soccer players
Süper Lig players
Liga MX players
Chilean Primera División players
Expatriate footballers in Chile
Expatriate footballers in Mexico
Designated Players (MLS)
Association football wingers
Association football forwards
Major League Soccer All-Stars
Colombian expatriate sportspeople in Chile
Colombian expatriate sportspeople in Mexico
Colombian expatriate sportspeople in the United States